Liu Qian is the name of:

Liu Zhiqian (died 894), Tang dynasty general and governor, more commonly known as Liu Qian in historical sources
Liu Qian (Investiture of the Gods), a fictional character from the 16th-century Chinese novel Investiture of the Gods

See also
Lu Chen (magician) (born 1976), Taiwanese magician
Qian Liu (852–932), Tang dynasty warlord and first king of Wuyue